Lynda Clark (born 29 October 1981) is an author and creator of interactive fiction. Her short story, “Ghillie’s Mum” won the Commonwealth Short Story Prize for Europe and Canada in 2018, and was shortlisted for the BBC Short Story Award in 2019. Her debut novel, Beyond Kidding, was published by Fairlight Books in October 2019.

Biography 
Born in Nottingham, Nottinghamshire, Clark completed a BA in English Literature, followed by an MA and a PhD in Creative Writing at Nottingham Trent University. She has worked as a bookseller at Waterstones  and in the video game industry as a writer and producer. Currently she is based in Dundee, Scotland where she works as a Research and Development Fellow in Narrative and Play at InGAME: Innovation for Games and Media Enterprise, University of Dundee.

Clark has the rare neurological disorder, Spasmodic Dysphonia, an incurable condition which affects speech.

Awards and shortlistings 
 2017 The Cambridge Short Story Prize (shortlist) for Grandma’s Feast Day
 2018 Regional winner, Commonwealth Short Story Prize for Europe and Canada for Ghillie's Mum
 2019 BBC National Short Story Award (shortlist) for Ghillie's Mum
 2019 New Media Writing Prize (shortlist) for The Memory Archivist 
 2019 Winner, BL Labs Artistic Award for The Memory Archivist
 2020 Authors' Licensing and Collecting Society (ALCS) Tom-Gallon Trust Award (shortlist) for Ghillie's Mum

Works

Novels 
 Beyond Kidding, 2019,

Short Stories 
 Dreaming in Quantum and Other Stories, 2021,

Interactive fiction 
 The Memory Archivist, 2019

Non-fiction 
 How I Ended the Wrestling Match Between My Brain and My Throat, 2013, The Guardian
 Why Final Fantasy 15’s beautiful food and ridiculous culinary preparation is the best thing in the game, 2017, Games Radar & Official XBox Magazine
 It's a Kind of Magic: The Tricks of Interactive Fiction, The Birmingham Journal of Literature and Language, VIII (2017), 55-65
 Before Westworld was Mudfog – Charles Dickens’ surprisingly modern dystopia, 2018, The Conversation & Smithsonian Magazine

See also 
 List of electronic literature authors, critics, and works
 Digital poetry
 E-book#History
 Electronic literature
 Hypertext fiction
 Interactive fiction
 Literatronica

References

External links 
 Lynda Clark's creator page on Itch.io
 Reviews
 Miki Lentin (14 September 2020). "REVIEW OF LYNDA CLARK’S ‘BEYOND KIDDING ’ BY MIKI LENTIN". The Mechanics’ Institute Review (MIR).
Miki Lentin (6 May 2021). "REVIEW: DREAMING IN QUANTUM BY LYNDA CLARK". The Mechanics’ Institute Review (MIR).
Stuart Kelly (1 June 2021). "Book reviews: Dreaming in Quantum and Other Stories by Lynda Clark | Man Hating Psycho by Iphgenia Baal". The Scotsman.

1981 births
Living people
Alumni of Nottingham Trent University
21st-century English women writers
Electronic literature writers
21st-century English novelists